Conus auricomus, common name the gold-leaf cone, is a species of sea snail, a marine gastropod mollusk in the family Conidae, the cone snails and their allies.

Like all species within the genus Conus, these snails are predatory and venomous. They are capable of "stinging" humans, therefore live ones should be handled carefully or not at all.

Description
The size of the shell varies between 32 mm and 69 mm. The cylindrical shell shows revolving striae throughout. Its reticulated pattern uniform in the size of the meshes, interrupted by three or four broad, uniform orange-brown bands. The convex spire is maculated.

Distribution
This species occurs in the Indian Ocean off the Mascarene Basin.

References

 Drivas, J.; Jay, M. (1987). Coquillages de La Réunion et de l'Île Maurice. Collection Les Beautés de la Nature. Delachaux et Niestlé: Neuchâtel. . 159 pp
 Puillandre N., Duda T.F., Meyer C., Olivera B.M. & Bouchet P. (2015). One, four or 100 genera? A new classification of the cone snails. Journal of Molluscan Studies. 81: 1–23

External links
 The Conus Biodiversity website
 Cone Shells – Knights of the Sea
 

auricomus
Gastropods described in 1792